Jack Regan (born 9 May 1997) is an Irish rugby union player, currently playing for the Highlanders in Super Rugby and the Mitre 10 Cup side Otago Rugby. He previously played for Irish Pro14 team Ulster Rugby. He plays as a lock.

Career
Regan started playing rugby underage at Birr RFC in Co. Offaly and was part of the Leinster under-age set up.

Ulster
Regan made his senior competitive debut for Ulster in their 54–42 defeat against Leinster in  the 2018–19 Pro14 on 20 December 2019, coming on as a replacement in this match.
In March 2020 he was released by Ulster.

Otago
Regan moved to New Zealand where he joined the Dunedin Sharks and was subsequently signed by Otago. He made his debut in Round 1 of the 2020 season against Auckland at Forsyth Barr Stadium.

Highlanders
In February 2021 Regan was called into the Highlanders squad as injury cover for some pre-season games. Regan made his Super Rugby debut for the Highlanders on 26 February in a 13–26 defeat to the Crusaders. He made his second appearance in the Highlanders first win of the season against the Chiefs in Hamilton.

References

External links
itsrugby.co.uk Profile

1997 births
Living people
Irish rugby union players
Ulster Rugby players
Rugby union locks
Otago rugby union players
Highlanders (rugby union) players
Ospreys (rugby union) players
Rugby union players from County Offaly